Oh! Baby is a 2019 Indian Telugu-language fantasy comedy film directed by B. V. Nandini Reddy. The film stars Samantha Akkineni and Lakshmi. A remake of the 2014 South Korean film Miss Granny, the plot follows a woman in her 70s (Lakshmi) who magically finds herself in the body of her 24-year-old self (Samantha) after having her picture taken at a mysterious photo studio. Naga Shaurya, Rajendra Prasad, Rao Ramesh, and Sajja Teja play supporting roles. The music was composed by Mickey J. Meyer.

Principal photography of the film began in December 2018. The film released theatrically on 5 July 2019 and received positive reviews, with praise for Samantha's performance. A remake is in development by Sajid Nadiadwala titled Jabudani.

Plot
Lecturer Shekhar / Nani explains the behavior of old people and talks about his mother Baby. She works in a canteen of her own in the same college which is co-owned by her childhood friend Pasupuleti Kanakaraj / Chanti. At a young age, she dreams to become a great singer, which does not come true. Right now, she aspires her grandson Rocky to fulfill her goal. However, her relationship with her daughter-in-law Madhavi does not run on good terms. Things get worse when Madhavi gets a heart attack and does not want to live with Baby. Even the doctors suggest the same.

Being cognizant of it, heartbroken, Baby quits the house and accuses God of her fate. On the way, Rocky calls her for his first music performance at an exhibition where God appears in the form of a saint, presents her with a statue of Lord Ganesha, and says it will change her fate. Nevertheless, she finds a photo studio and enters with the hope of getting a good photograph as she would like to print a beautiful photo of hers after her death in the newspaper. The same person appears as the photographer and promises to get back her beauty, after taking the picture. Astoundingly, she turns into a 24-year-old herself. Looking at it, she becomes bewildered when God appears, while praising Lord Shiva and tells her that this new life is given to fill her with joy and enlightenment. Thereafter, she accommodates herself in Chanti's house changing as Swathi, starts a new life, and also teams up with her grandson Rocky and becomes a part of the band. Meanwhile, Chanti realizes that Swathi herself is Baby and supports her at every step. Soon, Vikram, the head of the music company, likes Baby / Swathi's voice and gives her band an opportunity. Swathi supports Rocky throughout and encourages him to be better.

Vikram and Swathi begin spending a lot of time together, and she too starts taking an interest in him. After a lot of romantic comedy, Vikram proposes to Swathi when she is completely under dichotomy. At the same time, Chanti learns that if Baby loses her blood, she again turns into an old lady. At last, in the D-day finale of the competition, Rocky, unfortunately, meets with an accident, yet Baby participates and acquires the triumph. Immediately, Baby / Swathi rushes to the hospital leaving a letter for Vikram, convincing her to remember her acquaintance as a sweet memory and always be smiling. By this time Nani also realizes that she is his mother. But after reaching the hospital she finds Rocky requires AB-type blood which Baby donates, even after the refusal of Chanti and Nani, by stating that she is first and foremost Nani's mother and would always be there for him and his children and again transforms into an old lady.

After she returns, her family also realizes her value and she in turn is also more friendly with them as they can be seen enjoying a performance by Rocky (after his recovery). In the end, God transforms Chanti into a young man, who comes to pick up Baby.

Cast

Production

Development 
During November 2018, pre-production of an untitled film commenced with costume selection. Initially titled as "O Baby" with the tagline as "Yentha Sakkagunnave" with Samantha in the lead role, the full title was revealed to be as O Baby! Yentha Sakkagunnave in December 2018, being bankrolled by Sunitha Tati , People's Media Factory and Suresh Productions. The film's title is being inspired from one of her songs "Yentha Sakkagunnave", which describes the beauty of Samantha in the film, Rangasthalam.

Casting 
Apart from Samantha, Rao Ramesh, Snigdha, Naga Shourya, Lakshmi and Rajendra Prasad appear in supporting roles.

Filming 
Principal photography began in December 2018. The film was wrapped in mid May 2019.

Soundtrack

Music composed by Mickey J. Meyer and released on Aditya Music company.

Marketing and release 
The first look of film presenting Samantha Akkineni was released on 21 May 2019. The teaser of the film released on 25 May. The official theatrical trailer of the film was released on 20 June by Suresh Productions.

The movie was planned to be released on 5 July 2019, along with its dubbed version in Tamil language; it was released in India at this time, and in Kuwait and the United States on July 4, a day earlier. Official streaming partner is Netflix.

Reception

Critical reception 
The Times of India gave 3.5 out of 5 stars stating "Save for moments in the latter part of the film which are a tad bit melodramatic, Oh! Baby is an enjoyable ride. It's a film that has its heart in the right place and has a lot of great moments to take away from. Nandini Reddy has successfully adapted Korean classic Miss Granny, and has made it her own, and Tollywood is richer for it". The Indian Express gave 3 out of 5 stars stating "Samantha Akkineni thrives in the role that reflects the possibilities of youth, the burden of old age, and the society’s indifference to the desires and complaints of old people. Written by director BV Nandini Reddy and Lakshmi Bhupala, the film convincingly captures the circle of life". The News Minute gave 4 out of 5 stars stating "Adopting the body language of a 70-year-old is difficult, but Samantha gives it a reverent, comic touch in this Nandini Reddy directorial".

Deccan Chronicle gave 3.5 out of 5 stars stating "Oh! Baby is a fun film with an emotional touch that is neatly narrated by director Nandini Reddy. The film takes Samantha up a notch, and proves that she can carry a film by herself. They are supported by Rajendra Prasad and Lakshmi". Firstpost gave 4 out of 5 stars stating "Oh! Baby is a treasure box. Open it, dig into it, and cherish everything that it has to offer you. There’s a lot more to this film than just laughs. It’s like sunshine on a gloomy day. It’s a heart-warming film that you won't forget anytime soon". India Today gave 3 out of 5 stars stating "Oh! Baby, directed by Nandini Reddy, is everything nice and fine. It makes you understand the struggles your grandmother had to undergo and appreciate the life you have now. Watch it for Samantha and Rajendra Prasad's career-best performances".

Sangeetha Devi Dundoo of The Hindu wrote "Oh! Baby is a fun ode to the complexities that make up our elders. It’s an acknowledgement of their rough rides as much as it is about learning to count your blessings". Sify gave 3 out of 5 stars stating "Official remake of Korean drama Miss Granny, Samantha starrer Oh Baby is watchable for Samantha's energetic performance. Schmaltzy ending and flabby runtime almost kill the film but it finally works to an extent thanks to Samantha. This is for those who like candy-floss sentiment dramas".

Accolades

References

External links 
 

Indian comedy-drama films
Films about rapid human age change
Indian remakes of South Korean films
2010s Telugu-language films
Films directed by B. V. Nandini Reddy
Films set in Hyderabad, India
Suresh Productions films